Dutty Boukman (or Boukman Dutty; died 7 November 1791) was an early leader of the Haitian Revolution. Born in Senegambia (present-day Senegal and Gambia), he was enslaved 
to Jamaica. He eventually ended up in Haiti, where he became a leader of the Maroons and a vodou houngan (priest).

According to some contemporary accounts, Boukman, alongside Cécile Fatiman, a Vodou mambo, presided over the religious ceremony at Bois Caïman, in August 1791, that served as the catalyst to the 1791 slave revolt which is usually considered the beginning of the Haitian Revolution.

Boukman was a key leader of the slave revolt in the Le Cap‑Français region in the north of the colony. He was killed by the French planters and colonial troops on 7 November 1791, just a few months after the beginning of the uprising. The French then publicly displayed Boukman's head in an attempt to dispel the aura of invincibility that Boukman had cultivated. The fact that French authorities did this illustrates their belief in the importance Boukman held to Haitian people during this time.

Background
In about 1767, Dutty Boukman was born in the region of Senegambia (present-day Senegal and Gambia), where he was a Muslim cleric. He was captured in Senegambia, and transported as a slave to the Caribbean, first to the island of Jamaica, then Saint-Domingue, modern-day Haiti, where he became a Haitian Vodou houngan priest. After he attempted to teach other slaves how to read, he was sold to a French plantation owner and placed as a  commandeur (slave driver) and, later, a coach driver. His French name came from his English nickname, "Book Man", which scholars like Sylviane Anna Diouf and Sylviane Kamara have interpreted as having Islamic origins; they note that the term "man of the book" is a synonym for a Muslim in many parts of the world. Laurent Dubois argues that Boukman may have practiced a syncretic blend of traditional African religion and a form of Abrahamic religion.

Ceremony at the Bois Caïman
Contemporaneous accounts place the ceremony at Bois Caïman on or about 14 August 1791. Boukman and priestess Cécile Fatiman presided over the last of a series of meetings to organize a slave revolt for weeks in advance; the co-conspirators in attendance included Jean François, Biassou, Jeannot, and others. An animal was sacrificed, an oath was taken, and Boukman gave the following speech:

According to Gothenburg University researcher Markel Thylefors, "The event of the Bois Caïman ceremony forms an important part of Haitian national identity as it relates to the very genesis of Haiti."

According to the Encyclopedia of African Religion, "Blood from the animal was given in a drink to the attendees to seal their fates in loyalty to the cause of liberation of Saint-Domingue." A week later, 1800 plantations had been destroyed and 1000 slaveholders killed.
Boukman was not the first to attempt a slave uprising in Saint-Domingue, as he was preceded by others, such as Padrejean in 1676, and François Mackandal in 1757. However, his large size, warrior-like appearance, and fearsome temper made him an effective leader and helped spark the Haitian Revolution.

Legacy and references in popular culture
The band Boukman Eksperyans was named after him.
A fictionalized version of Boukman appears as the title character in American writer Guy Endore's novel Babouk, an anti-capitalist parable about the Haitian Revolution.
Haitians honored Boukman by admitting him into the pantheon of loa (guiding spirits).
The Boukman ("Bouckmann") uprising is retold in the Lance Horner book The Black Sun.
"The Bookman" is one of several devil masquerade characters still performed in Trinidad Carnival.
Haitian community activist Sanba Boukman, assassinated on 9 March 2012, took his name from Boukman.
In the 2014 film Top Five, the main character, André Allen (played by Chris Rock), is in the midst of a promotional tour for a Boukman biopic called Uprize.
In the Edwidge Danticat short story A Wall of Fire Rising, the character of Little Guy is cast as Boukman in his school play.

See also
 Bois Caïman
 Haitian Revolution

References
https://sites.duke.edu/blackatlantic/sample-page/storytelling-and-representation-of-bois-caiman/genealogy-of-bois-caiman-textual-sources/early-accounts-of-bois-caiman/

Further reading
 For an insightful article on the function of religion in the Haitian Revolution, see

External links

The Louverture Project: Boukman
Haitian Bicentennial Committee

1790s deaths
Colony of Jamaica people
People of Saint-Domingue
Haitian people of Jamaican descent
Haitian rebel slaves
Haitian Vodou practitioners
Haitian independence activists
Haitian Muslims
Jamaican slaves
Year of birth unknown
Gambian revolutionaries
Senegalese imams
Senegalese religious leaders
18th-century rebels